Alexander Iltyakov (born 9 October 1971, Kurgan, Kurgan Oblast) is a Russian political figure and a deputy of 6th, 7th, and 8th State Dumas. In 2008, he was awarded a Doctor of Sciences in Technical Sciences. 

In 1995, he, together with his brothers, founded the "Veles" meat processing plant. From 1995 to 2011, he worked as an executive director of the plant. In June 2011, Iltyakov presented to Vladimir Putin a business plan on how to develop meat production in the Ural region. The plan was later included in the All-Russia People's Front's program. The same year, Iltyakov was elected as a deputy of the 6th State Duma from the Kurgan Oblast constituency. In 2016 and 2021, he was re-elected for the 7th and 8th State Dumas respectively.

References

1971 births
Living people
United Russia politicians
21st-century Russian politicians
Eighth convocation members of the State Duma (Russian Federation)
Seventh convocation members of the State Duma (Russian Federation)
Sixth convocation members of the State Duma (Russian Federation)